Dundee United Football Club is a Scottish association football club based in the city of Dundee. The club's first ever tie in European competition was in the 1966–67 Inter-Cities Fairs Cup where they knocked out holders Barcelona in the Second round winning both legs in the process before losing in the following round to Italian giants Juventus despite winning the home leg 1-0. They had their best spell in the 1980s, reaching the semi-final of the European Cup in 1984 and the final of the UEFA Cup in 1987, also reaching the quarter-final stage of the latter in both 1982 and 1983. In total they have won 46 games in European competition, currently more than any Scottish club outwith the Old Firm and Aberdeen. 

Following a 10 year absence from European matches, Dundee United qualified for the 2022–23 UEFA Europa Conference League third qualifying round, culminating in a 7-1 aggregate loss to AZ Alkmaar, matching the record greatest loss inflicted on a Scottish Club in a European competition.

Matches

Overall record

By competition

By country

Records

References

Dundee United F.C.
Dundee United